Fongshan Junior High School is a station on the Orange line of the Kaohsiung MRT in Fongshan District, Kaohsiung, Taiwan.

Station overview

The station is a two-level, underground station with an island platform and three exits. The station is 256 meters long and is located at the intersection of Jhongshan E. Rd. and Ren-ai Rd.

Station layout

Exits
Exit 1: Fongshan Junior High School 
Exit 2: Fongshan Post Office Ren-ai Market
Exit 3: Chengde St., Shengli Rd., Jhongjheng Elementary School

Around the station
 Fongshan Junior High School
 Chunghwa Post Fongshan Post Office
 Republic of China Military Academy
 Former Japanese Navy Fongshan Communication Center
 Ruizhu Children's Park
 Huangbu Park
 Hangzhou Park
 Fengshan Ziqiang Park (鳳山自強公園)

References

2008 establishments in Taiwan
Kaohsiung Metro Orange line stations
Railway stations opened in 2008